Hong Huifang (born Ang Hwee Fong on 7 January 1961) is a Singaporean actress.

Career
Hong joined the SBC during the mid-1980s after completing the 5th drama training course alongside Yang Libing and Chen Tianwen, at age 22. She is perhaps best known by her generation for starring in Samsui Women and her role as Wang Jinfeng in The Price of Peace, for which she won her first acting award. In 2009, she starred in the highly rated drama Housewives' Holiday and earned a surprise Best Actress nomination. At the Star Awards 2010, Hong became the only artiste to earn nomination for three awards: Best Actress (Housewives' Holiday), Best Supporting Actress (Together) and Top 10 Most Popular Female Artistes.

Hong is also the first Singaporean actress to be nominated for the Best Leading Actress category at the prestigious Golden Horse Awards in 2022, for her outstanding performance as Auntie in the film Ajoomma. 

Hong has gotten 1 out of 10 Top 10 Most Popular Female Artistes from 2019 respectively.

Personal life 
Hong is married to fellow MediaCorp artiste Zheng Geping. They have a daughter and a son, Tay Ying and Calvert Tay, who also joined the local media scene.

Filmography

Television appearances

Film appearances

Compilation album

Awards and nominations

References

External links

Profile on xinmsn

Living people
Singaporean television actresses
Singaporean film actresses
Singaporean people of Teochew descent
1961 births
21st-century Singaporean actresses